Pacifique (French for "Pacific") may refer to:

 École du Pacifique, a French first language elementary school located in Sechelt, British Columbia, Canada
 Pacifique (album), the 4th studio album and soundtrack by the group Deep Forest released in 2000 by Sony Music / St George label
 Pacifique (band), a French rock music group
 Pacifique Issoïbeka, Congolese political figure who served in the government of Congo-Brazzaville as Minister of Finance from 2005 to 2009
 Pacifique de Provins, a French Capuchin Father of the 17th century
 Pacifique Plante (died 1976), also known as Pax Plante, crime fighting lawyer from the 1940s to the 1950s
 Pacifique Recording Studios, an award-winning mixing and recording studio based in North Hollywood, California
 Pacifique Niyongabire (born 2000), a Burundian-Australian footballer

See also

 Pacific (disambiguation)